Carney Chibueze Chukwuemeka (born 20 October 2003) is an English professional footballer who plays as a midfielder for  club Chelsea. A product of the Northampton Town and Aston Villa academies, he made his debut for the latter club's first team in 2021, before signing for Chelsea in 2022. Born in Austria to Nigerian parents, he represents England at youth international level.

Club career

Aston Villa 
Chukwuemeka joined the Aston Villa academy from the Northampton Town academy in March 2016. He signed his first professional contract with Villa in July 2020.

Chukwuemeka made his senior debut for the team on 19 May 2021 in a 2–1 away victory over Tottenham Hotspur, hitting the post within minutes of entering the game. On 23 May 2021, he was named Aston Villa Academy Player of the Season for the 2020–21 season. The following day, Chukwuemeka was part of the Aston Villa U18s squad that won the FA Youth Cup, beating Liverpool U18s 2–1 in the final.

Chukwuemeka made his first senior start on 24 August 2021 in a 6-0 victory against Barrow in the second round of the EFL Cup, and made his first league start four days later in a 1-1 draw with Brentford, a performance Paul Merson hailed as "outstanding", adding "he will be an absolute star".

Chelsea 
On 2 August 2022, Aston Villa and Chelsea confirmed that the clubs had reached an agreement for the permanent transfer of Chukwuemeka, subject to the player agreeing personal terms and undergoing a medical. On 4 August 2022, Chelsea announced the signing of Chukwuemeka on a six-year contract.

International career
Chukwuemeka is eligible to play for the national teams of Austria, England, Nigeria. After making two appearances for England U17 national team, on 29 March 2021, he made his debut for the England U18 squad in 2–0 victory over Wales.

On 2 September 2021, Chukwuemeka made his debut for the England U19s during a 2–0 victory over Italy U19s at St. George's Park, he also captained the side. On 10 November 2021, he scored his first englandU19 goal, in a 4–0 victory over Andorra U19 in a 2022 UEFA European Under-19 Championship qualification match.

On 17 June 2022, Chukwuemeka was named in the England squad for the 2022 UEFA European Under-19 Championship finals. Chukwuemeka featured in every game of their tournament, scoring in group stage victories against Austria and Serbia. On 1 July 2022, he scored the second goal in England's 3–1 extra time victory over Israel in the final.
 His performances during the competition led to his inclusion in the UEFA team of the tournament.

On 21 September 2022, Chukwuemeka made his England U20 debut during a 3–0 victory over Chile at the Pinatar Arena.

Personal life
Chukwuemeka is of Igbo descent. He was born in Austria to Nigerian parents and then later moved and was raised in Northampton, England. His older brother Caleb plays for Crawley Town.

He attended the Northampton School for Boys with his brother.

Career statistics

Honours 
Aston Villa U18s
 FA Youth Cup: 2020-21

England U19
 UEFA European Under-19 Championship: 2022

Individual
 UEFA European Under-19 Championship Team of the Tournament: 2022

References

External links
 
 

2003 births
Living people
Footballers from Northampton
English footballers
Association football midfielders
England youth international footballers
Austrian footballers
English sportspeople of Nigerian descent
Austrian people of Nigerian descent
Sportspeople of Nigerian descent
Austrian emigrants to England
Premier League players
Northampton Town F.C. players
Aston Villa F.C. players
Chelsea F.C. players
Black British sportspeople
People from Eisenstadt
Footballers from Burgenland